This is a list of seasons played by Clydebank F.C. (1965) in Scottish football, from their foundation as a professional club in 1965 to their takeover by Airdrie United in 2002. It details the club's achievements in senior league and cup competitions and the top scorers for each season. The list of top scorers also chronicles how the club's scoring records have progressed throughout the club's history.

Summary
Several clubs using the Clydebank name and wearing white-and-red colours had represented the town, including a team that entered the Scottish Cup in the 1890s and a separate entity which played in the Scottish Football League (SFL) from 1914 to 1931. In 1964, the town's Junior club, Clydebank Juniors, which had been playing since 1899, was merged with SFL club East Stirlingshire (based in Falkirk). The merger was ended after one season after a legal challenge by East Stirlingshire supporters. The Steedman brothers, who had been owners of East Stirlingshire, immediately decided to create a new club in Clydebank to apply for SFL entry, which was granted after one year playing in the Combined Reserve League.

The Bankies never won a senior competition other than the third level Second Division in 1976, but did play in the top tier of Scottish football for three seasons, and reached the Scottish Cup semi-finals in 1990.

In 1996, their Kilbowie Park ground was sold by the club owners, and the team played in Dumbarton for three seasons followed by three in Greenock (a town 13 miles away on the opposite bank of the River Clyde) whole the owners attempted to sell their place in the league. During this period, the fans staged numerous protests including a boycott of a fixture against East Stirlingshire in 1999, resulting in an official attendance of 29 being recorded.

In May 2002, a group of businessmen who had been unable to prevent Airdrieonians going out of business after 124 years subsequently took control of Clydebank, renamed them Airdrie United and relocated the team to Airdrie for 2002–03, changing the playing colours to those of the original Airdrieonians but retaining the league place of Clydebank. The Clydebank supporters reclaimed their club's name and crest and successfully applied to join the Junior setup for the following season – this is the Clydebank F.C. active in the 2020s.

Seasons

League performance summary 
The Scottish Football League was founded in 1890 and, other than during seven years of hiatus during World War II, the national top division has been played every season since. The following is a summary of Clydebank's divisional status from their foundation as a separate senior club in 1965 until their move to Airdrie in 2002:

37 total eligible seasons
3 seasons in top level
29 seasons in second level
4 seasons in third level
0 seasons in fourth level
1 season not involved – before club was league member

References

Sources
Soccerbase
FitbaStats
Football Club History Database

Seasons
 
Clydebank
Clydebank Seasons